The men's floor  or free-handed exercise event was part of the gymnastics programme at the 1932 Summer Olympics. It was contested for the first time at the Olympics. The competition was held on Monday, August 8, 1932. Twenty-five gymnasts from six nations competed.

Medalists

Results

A separate competition was held, unrelated to the all-around event but only participants from the all-around contest were allowed to compete. Georges Miez was allowed to compete by special permission.

References

External links
 Olympic Report
 

Floor